Puerto Rico Highway 715 (PR-715) is a rural road located in Cayey, Puerto Rico. This highway extends from PR-1 between Matón Arriba and Sumido barrios to Cercadillo.

Major intersections

See also

 List of highways numbered 715

References

715
Cayey, Puerto Rico